Tim Ohlbrecht (born August 30, 1988) is a retired German professional basketball player. He won 84 caps for the German men's national team, competing in the 2008 Olympic Games, the 2010 World Championships as well as the European Championships in 2009 and 2011. He mostly played for teams in the German Bundesliga. Ohlbrecht had three NBA appearances for the Houston Rockets. He won two NBA D-League championships.

Professional career
Ohlbrecht began his professional playing career with the German League club Bayer Giants Leverkusen, during the 2005–06 season. He then signed with the German League club Brose Baskets in 2006. He was loaned to TSV Breitengüßbach, where he played in both the German 2nd Division, and the German 3rd Division, from 2006 to 2008. He was also loaned to Nürnberger BC, where he played in the German 2nd Division, during the 2007–08 season.

Ohlbrecht, due to his age, was available for the 2010 NBA draft, but subsequently went undrafted. Ohlbrecht then signed with Telekom Baskets Bonn for the 2010–11 season. In the summer of 2011, he signed with Skyliners Frankfurt for the 2011–12 season.

In November 2012, Ohlbrecht was acquired by the Rio Grande Valley Vipers. On February 4, 2013, he was named to the Prospects All-Star team for the 2013 NBA D-League All-Star Game. On February 25, 2013, he was signed to a multi-year deal by the NBA's Houston Rockets. The Rockets sent Ohlbrecht back to the Vipers as a D-League assignee on April 9, 2013. On July 15, 2013, he was waived by the Rockets.

On July 16, 2013, he was claimed off of waivers by the Philadelphia 76ers. However, he was later waived by the 76ers on October 16.

On November 30, 2013, he was re-acquired by the Rio Grande Valley Vipers. On March 1, 2014, he was traded to the Fort Wayne Mad Ants.

On August 5, 2014, he signed a one-year deal with ratiopharm Ulm.

On July 27, 2015, he signed with the Russian club Yenisey Krasnoyarsk for the 2015–16 season.

On June 30, 2016, Ohlbrecht returned to ratiopharm Ulm, signing a two-year contract. On May 6, 2017, he signed a contract extension with Ulm till June 2020.

He retired in 2018 due to problems with his knees.

German national team
Ohlbrecht made his debut with the senior men's German national basketball team in 2008. He participated, together with Dirk Nowitzki, in the 2008 Summer Olympics. Ohlbrecht played again for Germany at the EuroBasket 2009, the 2010 FIBA World Championship, and the EuroBasket 2011.

After his career 
Ohlbrecht settled in Boerne, Texas and became a realtor. He also founded the Tim Ohlbrecht Elite Basketball program, offering individual practice for youth and collegiate athletes as well as basketball camps for children.

NBA career statistics

Regular season

|-
| align="left" | 
| align="left" | Houston
| 3 || 0 || 3.9 || .333 || – || 1.000 || .3 || .3 || .3 || .0 || 1.0
|-
| colspan=2 align="left" | Career
| 3 || 0 || 3.9 || .333 || – || 1.000 || .3 || .3 || .3 || .0 || 1.0

References

External links
Official Website
Euroleague.net profile
Eurobasket.com profile
NBA D-League profile
NBA Prospects profile

1988 births
Living people
2010 FIBA World Championship players
Basketball players at the 2008 Summer Olympics
Bayer Giants Leverkusen players
BC Enisey players
Brose Bamberg players
Centers (basketball)
Fort Wayne Mad Ants players
German expatriate basketball people in the United States
Houston Rockets players
National Basketball Association players from Germany
German men's basketball players
Nürnberg Falcons BC players
Olympic basketball players of Germany
Power forwards (basketball)
Ratiopharm Ulm players
Rio Grande Valley Vipers players
Skyliners Frankfurt players
Sportspeople from Wuppertal
Telekom Baskets Bonn players
Undrafted National Basketball Association players